Callinicus served as Greek Orthodox Patriarch of Alexandria between 1858 and 1861. He was a Greek cleric, born as Konstantinos Kyparissis in Skotina, Pieria, in 1800. He died in Mytilini in 1889.

References
 

1800 births
1889 deaths
19th-century Greek Patriarchs of Alexandria
Greek Macedonians
Bishops of Thessaloniki
People from Pieria (regional unit)
Greek expatriate bishops
Greek people from the Ottoman Empire